Maghera may refer to:

Maghera, a town in County Londonderry, Northern Ireland
Maghera, County Down, a civil parish in County Down, Northern Ireland
Maghera (parish), a parish in County Londonderry, Northern Ireland
Maghera transmission site a mountain and radio/television transmission site in County Clare, Ireland.
Maghera village, Vârfu Câmpului Commune, Botoșani County, Romania